Izhbulyak (Ösbüläk) is a rural locality (a selo) in Dedovsky Selsoviet, Fyodorovsky District, Bashkortostan, Russia. The population was 447 as of 2010. There are 10 streets.

Geography 
Izhbulyak is located 23 km southwest of Fyodorovka (the district's administrative centre) by road. Bazelevo is the nearest rural locality.

References 

Rural localities in Fyodorovsky District